Derrick Keith Brew  (born December 28, 1977) is a 2004 Olympic Gold medalist in the Men's 4x400 meter relay for the United States.  Earlier in the games he took third in the US sweep of the 400m.

Born in Houston, Texas, he attended Klein Forest High School where he was coached by Jack Sands.

Notes

References

External links
 Derrick Brew's U.S. Olympic Team bio
 USA Track & Field Bio

1977 births
Living people
American male sprinters
African-American male track and field athletes
Athletes (track and field) at the 2004 Summer Olympics
Olympic gold medalists for the United States in track and field
Olympic bronze medalists for the United States in track and field
Track and field athletes from Houston
World Athletics Championships medalists
Medalists at the 2004 Summer Olympics
Universiade medalists in athletics (track and field)
Barton Cougars men's track and field athletes
Goodwill Games medalists in athletics
Universiade gold medalists for the United States
World Athletics Championships winners
Medalists at the 1999 Summer Universiade
Competitors at the 2001 Goodwill Games
21st-century African-American sportspeople
20th-century African-American sportspeople